AirWatch was an Atlanta-based provider of enterprise mobility management (EMM) software and standalone management systems for content, applications and email. AirWatch was acquired by VMware, Inc. in February 2014.

Note: AirWatch was the name of both the company and a product. Airwatch was again rebranded to Workspace ONE Unified Endpoint Management.

History 

AirWatch was founded in 2003 as Wandering WiFi by John Marshall, who served as president and CEO. Alan Dabbiere has been the chairman since 2006 .  In February 2013, AirWatch received its first round of funding from Insight Venture Partners and Accel.
In July 2013, the company acquired Motorola Solutions's MSP (Mobility Services Platform) seeking to extend its portfolio to ruggedized devices. 

On February 24, 2014, the company was acquired by VMware, Inc, and the EMM product eventually was rebranded as AirWatch by VMware and then VMware AirWatch. In May 2018 the enterprise product was rebranded to Workspace ONE Unified Endpoint Management with the release of version 9.4. The product is still sometimes referred to as VMware Workspace ONE UEM powered by AirWatch. The name AirWatch is slowly being phased out.

AirWatch UK Limited was dissolved on 24 Apr 2018 with the company's final absorption into VMware as a business unit rather than an wholly owned entity.

On 31 January 2020 the AirWatch offices in Milton Keynes, United Kingdom were closed.

References 

Companies based in Atlanta
Information technology companies of the United States
Software companies established in 2003
2003 establishments in Georgia (U.S. state)
Defunct software companies of the United States
VMware